Owen Campbell may refer to:
Owen Campbell (musician) (born 1987), Australian blues singer-songwriter and guitarist
Owen Campbell (rugby league) (1918–1993), Australian rugby league player
Owen Campbell (actor) (born 1995), American actor